The National Research Tomsk State University, TSU is a public research university located in Tomsk, Russia. The university, which opened in 1888, was the first university in the Asian part of Russia and, in practice, the first Russian university East of the Volga.

There are 23 Faculties and Institutes with 151 Departments and about 23,000 students. In 2022, the university was ranked #272 by QS World University Rankings, #601 by World University Rankings by Times Higher Education, and #901 by Academic Ranking of World Universities.

History

Imperial University
On May 16 (28 N.S.), 1878, Emperor Alexander II signed a decree on the establishment of the first higher education institution between the Russian Urals and the Pacific Ocean. The move was supported by major industrialist and businessmen, who contributed with private funds, as well as by local city councils in Siberia, but was opposed by conservative voices within the State Council, notably Konstantin Pobedonostsev, who complained about the cost of the project and the fact that local Tomsk society consisted of "all sorts of rabble". Nevertheless, the project progressed, albeit slowly, and on September 1, 1888 the first faculty (medicine) of the Siberian Imperial University named after His Imperial Majesty Alexander III finally opened. Classes to the first 72 students were handled by eight professors, aided by seven assistants and laboratory technicians. Professor Nikolai Gezekhus was appointed the first rector of the University. It would take a decade for the second faculty of the university (Law) to become operational.

Russian invasion of Ukraine
In March 2022, Eduard Vladimirovich Galazhinsky, Rector of the university, was suspended by the European University Association (EUA) following support for the 2022 Russian invasion of Ukraine by the Russian Union of Rectors (RUR), for being "diametrically opposed to the European values that they committed to when joining EUA”. Professor Terry Callaghan, who had helped establish 21 Russian environmental research stations in the Arctic, paused his professorship at Tomsk State University after the rectors’ statement.

Faculties

Reputation

In 2022, the university was ranked #272 by QS World University Rankings, #601 by World University Rankings by Times Higher Education, and #901 by Academic Ranking of World Universities by Shanghai Jiao Tong University.  As of 2017, National Research Tomsk State University was the overall third best classical university in Russia according to RIA Novosti—outperformed only by Moscow State University and Ural Federal University.

During Soviet times the university was awarded as the Order of the October Revolution and Order of the Red Banner of Labour.

Academics

StrAUs are Strategic Academic Units that focused on the study of the transformation taking place with the man, society, and the natural and man-made environment. TSU has 4 StrAUs, Institute of Biomedicine, Institute of the Human of the Digital Era, Institute of Smart Materials and Technology and Siberian Institute of the Future.

The Research Library and Tomsk State University were opened in the same year, 1888. The founder of the library was Vasily Florinskiy – physician and writer, organizer of Tomsk University.

Notable people

 Alexei Didenko – Graduate of Tomsk University law faculty (2005), deputy of Tomsk Oblast duma, and regional coordinator of the Liberal Democratic Party of Russia.
 Alexandre Dogiel - Histologist, neuroscientist
 Nikolay Aleksandrovich Gezehus – First rector of Tomsk University (1888-89), professor and founder of physics research at the university.
 Nikolay Feofanovich Kaschenko – Professor and founder of the school of vertebrate zoology at Tomsk University, member of Ukrainian SSR Academy of Sciences, rector of Tomsk University (1893-95), and professor of the Kiev Polytechnic Institute.
 Aleksey Aleksandrovich Kulyabko – Graduated as a doctor of medicine from Tomsk University in 1893, professor at Tomsk University from 1903-24, founder of the School of Physiology.
 Pyotr Lyashchenko - Economist, served as rector of the university.
 Ioaniky Malinovsky - Jurist and historian of law, opponent of the death penalty, taught at Tomsk University 1898-1911
 Fritz Noether - German mathematician and former professor; executed by the Stalinist NKVD.
 Antonina Polozhy – Graduated Tomsk in 1939, became a professor at the university in the botanical field. 
 Sergey Psakhie – Graduate and former professor of Tomsk University, Chairman of the Presidium of the Tomsk Scientific Centre of the Siberian Division of the Russian Academy of Sciences.
 Mikhail Reisner - Lawyer, jurist, historian of law.
 Grigory Shajn - Graduate and astronomer. 
 Mikhail Usanovich - Professor and physical chemist, known for his generalized acid-base theory.

Nobel laureates
 Ivan Petrovich Pavlov - Professor and head of pharmacology for a brief period in 1890. Later, became the first Russian Nobel laureate upon winning the Nobel Prize for Physiology or Medicine in 1904.
 Nikolay Nikolayevich Semyonov - Junior assistant in the physics faculty. In 1956,  was awarded the Nobel Prize in Chemistry.

References

External links 

 The official website of Tomsk State University (English) 
 TSU Research Library
 TSU International Student Services Centre 
 TSU at Coursera 
 TSU Science Portal

 
Universities in Tomsk Oblast
Educational institutions established in 1878
1878 establishments in the Russian Empire
Public universities and colleges in Russia
National research universities in Russia